Jovanović  is the most common Serbian surname. It derives from Jovan, which is comparable to John in English. The part ov designates possession: Jovanov means John's. The suffix ić is a diminutive designation, or descendant designation. It is spelled in Austria as Jovanovic. So, the last name can be translated as John's son leading to the English equivalent last name of Johnson.

Geographical distribution
As of 2014, 86.2% of all known bearers of the surname Jovanović were residents of Montenegro (frequency 1:48), 6.2% of Bosnia and Herzegovina (1:327), 3.0% of Serbia (1:118), 2.1% of Kosovo (1:514) and 1.5% of Croatia (1:1,614).

In Serbia, the frequency of the surname was higher than national average (1:48) in the following districts:
 1. Pomoravlje District (1:27)
 2. Nišava District (1:27)
 3. Zaječar District (1:30)
 4. Jablanica District (1:30)
 5. Braničevo District (1:31)
 6. Pirot District (1:31)
 7. Rasina District (1:32)
 8. Toplica District (1:33)
 9. Podunavlje District (1:33)
 10. Šumadija District (1:35)
 11. Bor District (1:37)
 12. Mačva District (1:41)
 13. Kolubara District (1:42)
 14. Pčinja District (1:45)
 15. Belgrade (1:46)

People
 Aleksandar Jovanović (disambiguation), several people
 Ana Jovanović (born 1984), Serbian tennis player
 Anastas Jovanović (1817–1899), Serbian photographer
 Anđelko Jovanović, Montenegrin footballer
 Arso Jovanović (1907–1948), Montenegrin soldier and Partisan
 Biljana Jovanović (1953–1996), Serbian writer, peace activist and feminist
 Boris Jovanović, Serbian footballer
 Borislav Jovanović (writer), a Montenegrin writer
 Borislav Jovanović (footballer), a Serbian footballer
 Borivoje Jovanović-Brana (1883–1905), Serbian guerrilla
 Boro Jovanović (born 1939), a former Yugoslav tennis player
 Boyan Jovanovic (born 1951), a Serbian-American economist
 Branislav Jovanović, Serbian footballer
 Čedomir Jovanović, (born 1971), Serbian politician
 Đorđe Jovanović (1861–1953), Serbian sculptor
 Dragan Jovanović (disambiguation), several people
 Dragutin Jovanović-Lune (1892–1932), Serbian guerrilla
 Dušan Jovanović (disambiguation), several people
 Goran Jovanović (footballer, born 1977), Serbian football player
 Goran Jovanović (football coach), Serbian football player
 Igor Jovanović, Croatian born footballer
 Ivan Jovanović (disambiguation), several people
 Ilija Jovanović-Pčinjski (1878–1913), Serbian guerrilla
 Jovan Jovanović (disambiguation), several people
 Ljiljana Jovanović (1930-2012), Serbian actress
 Ljubomir Jovanović (1865–1928), Serbian politician and historian
 Ljubomir S. Jovanović (1877–1913), Serbian guerrilla
Marko Jovanovic (basketball player, born 1999), Serbian basketball player
 Marko Jovanović (footballer, born 1978), Serbian footballer
 Marko Jovanović (footballer, born 1988), Serbian footballer
 Marko Jovanović (footballer, born 1989), Serbian footballer
 Mateja Jovanović, Serbian basketball player
 Mihailo Jovanović (born 1975), Serbian footballer
 Mihailo Jovanović (footballer, born 1989), Serbian footballer
 Mihailo Jovanović (metropolitan) (1826–1898), former Metropolitan of Belgrade
 Milan Jovanović (disambiguation), multiple people
 Miloš Jovanović, Serbian politician
 Nataša Jovanović (Progressive Party politician), Serbian politician
 Nataša Jovanović (Serbian Radical Party politician)
 Nemanja Jovanović (born 1984), Serbian footballer
 Nikola Jovanović (disambiguation), multiple people
 Paja Jovanović (1859–1957), Serbian realist painter
 Sanja Jovanović (born 1986), Croatian swimmer
 Slobodan Jovanović (1869–1958), Serbian prime minister
 Suzana Jovanović, a popular Serbian pop-folk singer
 Toša Jovanović (1846–1893), Serbian actor
 Vasa Jovanović (1874–1970), lawyer, politician, founder of the Chetnik movement 
 Vera Jovanović (born 1947), Serbian politician
 Vesna Jovanovic (born 1976), Serbian-American artist
 Vladimir Jovanović (politician) (1833–1922), Serbian political theorist and politician
 Vukašin Jovanović (born 1996), Serbian footballer
 Željko Jovanović (disambiguation), multiple people
 Zlatko Jovanović, Bosnian basketball player
 Marie Yovanovitch, US diplomat and figure in first impeachment of Donald Trump

See also
Jovančić

References

Serbian surnames
Montenegrin surnames
Patronymic surnames
Surnames from given names